Our Man Higgins is an American sitcom that aired on ABC from October 3, 1962, to May 17, 1963.

Synopsis
Our Man Higgins follows the adventures of an English butler portrayed by Stanley Holloway, who is inherited by a suburban American family, resulting in a culture clash that grows into a cultural blending.

Higgins answers to Duncan and Alice MacRoberts, played by Frank Maxwell and Audrey Totter.  Joining Holloway, Maxwell and Totter were Ricky Kelman, K.C. Butts, and Regina Groves, who portrayed the children Tommy, Dinghy, and Joanie MacRoberts, respectively.

It's Higgins, Sir was previously a 13-episode NBC radio comedy series in 1951, created and produced by Paul Harrison, and written by Harrison and Rik Vollaerts. Harry McNaughton read the starring role of Higgins in that series, broadcast on Tuesdays at 9 P.M. (as Bob Hope's summer replacement).

Cast
Stanley Holloway as Higgins
Regina Groves as Joanie MacRoberts
Audrey Totter as Alice MacRoberts
Ricky Kelman as Tommy MacRoberts 
Frank Maxwell as Duncan MacRoberts
K.C. Butts as Dinghy MacRoberts

Episodes

Guest stars

Don Drysdale
Stuart Erwin
Reginald Gardiner
Connie Gilchrist
Sylvia Field
Paul Hartman
Julian Holloway
Edward Everett Horton
Bernie Kopell

Cheryl Miller
Roger Mobley
Slim Pickens
Stafford Repp
Roy Roberts
Kurt Russell
Martha Stewart
Dick Wessel
Mary Wickes
Dick Wilson

Scheduling
Our Man Higgins, co-sponsored by General Motors' Pontiac division and American Tobacco, aired on ABC at 9:30 P.M. Eastern on Wednesdays opposite The Dick Van Dyke Show on CBS and the second half of Perry Como's Kraft Music Hall on NBC. Higgins followed another one-year ABC series Going My Way, starring Gene Kelly, Dick York, and Leo G. Carroll, in a television version of the 1944 Bing Crosby film.

References

External links 
 

1962 American television series debuts
1963 American television series endings
1960s American sitcoms
American Broadcasting Company original programming
Black-and-white American television shows
English-language television shows
Fictional butlers
Television series about families
Television series based on radio series
Television series by Screen Gems